Lectionary 323 (Gregory-Aland), designated by siglum ℓ 323 (in the Gregory-Aland numbering) is a Greek manuscript of the New Testament, on parchment. Palaeographically it has been assigned to the 13th century. The manuscript has survived in complete condition.

Description 

The original codex contained lessons from the Gospel of John, Matthew, and Luke (Evangelistarium), on 213 parchment leaves. The leaves are measured. It contains also the Synaxarion (folios 190-212v), Homilies of John Chrysostom to Genesis (folios 213r-v).

The text is written in Greek minuscule letters, in one column per page, 18 lines per page. The ink is brown.

The codex contains weekday Gospel lessons. 318, 321 and 323 sometimes agree with each other in departing form the ordinary weekday Church lessons.

History 

Scrivener dated the manuscript to the 12th century, Gregory dated it to the 13th century. It has been assigned by the Institute for New Testament Textual Research to the 13th century.

It was purchased from Spyridon P. Lambros from Athens, on 26 March 1859 (along with lectionaries 321, 322, and 324).

The manuscript was added to the list of New Testament manuscripts by Frederick Henry Ambrose Scrivener (271e) and Caspar René Gregory (number 323e). Gregory saw it in 1883.

The manuscript was mentioned by Catalogue of Additions to the Manuscripts in the British Museum, 1854-1875, by M. Richard.

The codex is housed at the British Library (Add MS 22743) in London.

The fragment is not cited in critical editions of the Greek New Testament (UBS4, NA28).

See also 

 List of New Testament lectionaries
 Biblical manuscript
 Textual criticism
 Lectionary 320

Notes and references

Bibliography

External links 
 Add MS 22743 Digitised Manuscripts

Greek New Testament lectionaries
13th-century biblical manuscripts
British Library additional manuscripts